Val St. Germain is a former professional Canadian football offensive lineman who played fourteen seasons in the Canadian Football League for the Hamilton Tiger-Cats, Edmonton Eskimos, Ottawa Renegades, Winnipeg Blue Bombers, and Saskatchewan Roughriders. St. Germain was named Division All-Star in 1998, 1999 and 2003. He won one Grey Cup championship, coming in his final year in 2007. He played college football at McGill University.

He officially announced his retirement from professional football on January 31, 2008. He is currently a Certified Financial Planner and Training Manager with Freedom 55 Financial in Ottawa, ON.

References

External links
http://www.f55fottawa.com/management
 
Winnipeg Blue Bombers bio
 CFL.ca bio

1971 births
Living people
Canadian football offensive linemen
Edmonton Elks players
Hamilton Tiger-Cats players
Ottawa Renegades players
Saskatchewan Roughriders players
Winnipeg Blue Bombers players
McGill Redbirds football players
McGill University alumni
Canadian football people from Ottawa
Players of Canadian football from Ontario